The 1937 Boston University Terriers football team was an American football team that represented Boston University as an independent during the 1937 college football season. In its fourth season under head coach Pat Hanley, the team compiled a 6–2 record and outscored opponents by a total of 143 to 45.

Schedule

References

Boston University
Boston University Terriers football seasons
Boston University Terriers football